The 2003–04 NHL season was the 87th regular season of the National Hockey League. The Stanley Cup champions were the Tampa Bay Lightning, who won the best of seven series four games to three against the Calgary Flames.

For the fourth time in eight years, the all-time record for total shutouts in a season was shattered, as 192 shutouts were recorded. The 2003–04 regular season was also the first one (excluding the lockout-shortened 1994–95 season) since 1967–68 in which there was neither a 50-goal scorer, nor a 100-point scorer. This was the final season that ABC and ESPN televised NHL games until 2021–22. It was also the final NHL season before the 2004–05 NHL lockout with games resuming in the fall of 2005 as part of the 2005–06 season, and the final season in which games could end in ties.

League business
The schedule of 82 games was revamped. The new format increased divisional games from five to six per team (24 total), and decreased inter-conference games to at least one per team, with three extra games (18 in total).

The alternating of jerseys was changed. For the first season since the 1969–70 season, teams would now wear their colored jerseys at home and white jerseys away.

The Phoenix Coyotes moved to a new arena in Glendale, Arizona, after playing their first seven seasons at America West Arena.

Regular season
The 2003–04 season was one overhung by concern over the expiry of the NHL Collective Bargaining Agreement. It led to the cancellation of the League's games for the entirety of the next season. During the entire season, NHL Commissioner Gary Bettman and NHL Players' Association (NHLPA) head Bob Goodenow waged a war of words with no agreement being signed.

On September 26, just before the season was to begin, young Atlanta Thrashers star Dany Heatley crashed his Ferrari in suburban Atlanta. The passenger, Thrashers teammate Dan Snyder, was killed. Heatley himself was badly injured and eventually charged with vehicular homicide.

Entering the season, the two Stanley Cup favorites were the Ottawa Senators in the Eastern Conference, who had won the Presidents' Trophy and come within a win of the Stanley Cup Finals the year before, and the Colorado Avalanche in the Western Conference, who, despite losing legendary goaltender Patrick Roy to retirement, added both Teemu Selanne and Paul Kariya to an already star-studded lineup. Neither of these teams, however, were as successful as expected, with Ottawa finishing fifth in their conference and Colorado finishing fourth, losing the Northwest Division title for the first time in a decade when the franchise was still known as the Quebec Nordiques.

The greatest disappointments were the Mighty Ducks of Anaheim, who, despite making it to Game 7 of the Stanley Cup Finals the year prior and adding both Sergei Fedorov and Vaclav Prospal, failed to make the playoffs. The Los Angeles Kings failed to make the playoffs in large part due to a season-ending 11-game losing streak. In the East, the star-studded New York Rangers again failed to make the playoffs. The Washington Capitals, who were regarded as a contender, also stumbled early in the season and never recovered. The end of the season saw two of the most extensive housecleanings in League history, as the Rangers and Capitals traded away many of their stars and entered "rebuilding mode." The Capitals traded away Jaromir Jagr, Peter Bondra, Sergei Gonchar, Robert Lang and Anson Carter, while the Rangers moved Petr Nedved, Brian Leetch, Anson Carter and Alexei Kovalev to other NHL teams.

The most surprising teams were the Tampa Bay Lightning in the East and the San Jose Sharks in the West. The Lightning, who had a remarkable season with only 20 man-games lost to injury, finished atop the Eastern Conference, while the Sharks, who were firmly in rebuilding mode after a disastrous 28–37–9–8 campaign the last season, came second in the West and won the Pacific Division.

Two other teams that did better than expected were carried by surprising young goaltenders. The Calgary Flames ended a seven-year playoff drought backed by the solid play of Miikka Kiprusoff, and the Boston Bruins won the Northeast Division by a whisker over the Toronto Maple Leafs with the help of eventual Calder Memorial Trophy-winning goaltender Andrew Raycroft.

Goaltending was also the story of the Presidents' Trophy-winning Detroit Red Wings as the return from retirement of legend Dominik Hasek bumped Curtis Joseph to the minor leagues. At the same time, long-time back up Manny Legace recorded better numbers than both veterans and won the starting job in the playoffs.

Of note is the fact that the Nashville Predators made the playoffs for the first time in franchise history, though they were dispatched by a star-studded Detroit Red Wings team in the first round.

The regular season ended controversially, when in March 2004, the Vancouver Canucks' Todd Bertuzzi infamously attacked and severely injured the Colorado Avalanche's Steve Moore, forcing the latter to eventually retire.

Final standings
Detroit Red Wings won the Presidents' Trophy and home-ice advantage throughout the playoffs.

For rankings in conference, division leaders are automatically ranked 1–3. These three, plus the next five teams in the conference standings, earn playoff berths at the end of the season.

Eastern Conference

Western Conference

Playoffs

Bracket

Awards
The NHL Awards presentation took place in Toronto.

All-Star teams

Player statistics

Scoring leaders
Note: GP = Games played, G = Goals, A = Assists, Pts = Points

Leading goaltenders
Note: GP = Games played; Mins = Minutes played; W = Wins; L = Losses: OT = Overtime losses; GA = Goals allowed; SO = Shutouts; GAA = Goals against average

Coaches

Eastern Conference
Atlanta Thrashers: Bob Hartley
Boston Bruins: Mike O'Connell
Buffalo Sabres: Lindy Ruff
Carolina Hurricanes: Peter Laviolette
Florida Panthers: Rick Dudley and John Torchetti
Montreal Canadiens: Claude Julien
New Jersey Devils: Pat Burns
New York Islanders: Steve Stirling
New York Rangers: Glen Sather
Ottawa Senators: Jacques Martin
Philadelphia Flyers: Ken Hitchcock
Pittsburgh Penguins: Ed Olczyk
Tampa Bay Lightning: John Tortorella
Toronto Maple Leafs: Pat Quinn
Washington Capitals: Glen Hanlon

Western Conference
Mighty Ducks of Anaheim: Mike Babcock
Calgary Flames: Darryl Sutter
Chicago Blackhawks: Brian Sutter
Colorado Avalanche: Tony Granato
Columbus Blue Jackets: Doug MacLean
Dallas Stars: Dave Tippett
Detroit Red Wings: Dave Lewis
Edmonton Oilers: Craig MacTavish
Los Angeles Kings: Andy Murray
Minnesota Wild: Jacques Lemaire
Nashville Predators: Barry Trotz
Phoenix Coyotes: Bobby Francis and Rick Bowness
San Jose Sharks: Ron Wilson
St. Louis Blues: Joel Quenneville
Vancouver Canucks: Marc Crawford

Milestones

Debuts
The following is a list of players of note who played their first NHL game in 2003–04 (listed with their first team):
Chris Kunitz, Mighty Ducks of Anaheim
Patrice Bergeron, Boston Bruins
Jason Pominville, Buffalo Sabres
Derek Roy, Buffalo Sabres
Eric Staal, Carolina Hurricanes
Travis Moen, Chicago Blackhawks
Tuomo Ruutu, Chicago Blackhawks
Nikolai Zherdev, Columbus Blue Jackets
Niklas Kronwall, Detroit Red Wings
Dustin Brown, Los Angeles Kings
Brent Burns, Minnesota Wild
Tomas Plekanec, Montreal Canadiens
Jordin Tootoo, Nashville Predators
Marek Zidlicky, Nashville Predators
Dominic Moore, New York Rangers
Fedor Tyutin, New York Rangers
Marc-Andre Fleury, Pittsburgh Penguins
Ryan Kesler, Vancouver Canucks
Alexander Semin, Washington Capitals

Last games

The following is a list of players of note who played their last NHL game in 2003–04, listed with their team:

Valeri Bure, Dallas Stars
Shayne Corson, Dallas Stars
Vincent Damphousse, San Jose Sharks
Ron Francis, Toronto Maple Leafs
Kenny Jonsson, New York Islanders
Joé Juneau, Montreal Canadiens
Mike Keane, Vancouver Canucks
Trent Klatt, Los Angeles Kings
Igor Larionov, New Jersey Devils
 Curtis Leschyshyn, Ottawa Senators
Al MacInnis, St. Louis Blues
Mark Messier, New York Rangers (The last active player to have played in the World Hockey Association, also last player to have played in the 1970s.)
Adam Oates, Edmonton Oilers
James Patrick, Buffalo Sabres
Felix Potvin, Boston Bruins
Scott Stevens, New Jersey Devils
Steve Thomas, Detroit Red Wings
Roman Turek, New Jersey Devils

See also
List of Stanley Cup champions
NHL All-Star Game
NHL All-Rookie Team
2003 in sports
2004 in sports
Red Mile

References
 
Notes

External links
Hockey Database
NHL Official Website

 
1
1